Greaves is an English surname. Notable people with the surname include:

 Aaron Greaves, Australian rules football coach and former player 
 Angie Greaves, British radio presenter in London
 Benjamin Greaves, Walking Forge World 
 Bob Greaves, British journalist, TV presenter and producer
 Charles Greaves, engineer
 Charles Sprengel Greaves, legal writer
 C. J. Greaves, American racing driver
 Dan Greaves (athlete) (born 1982), British athlete
 Daniel Greaves (musician), Canadian rock vocalist and songwriter
 Danny Greaves (footballer), English former professional footballer
 Sir Edward Greaves, 1st Baronet (1608–1680), English royal physician
 Edward Greaves (Australian politician) (1910–1964), member of the New South Wales Legislative Assembly 
 Edward Greaves (MP) (1803–1879), English banker and Conservative politician
 Edward Evelyn Greaves (born 1940), High Commissioner of Barbados to Canada
 Gary Greaves, American football player
 Genielle Greaves (born 1983), Saint Vincent and the Grenadines cricketer
 Ian Greaves (1942–2009), English footballer for Manchester United etc.
 Jane Greaves, British astronomy
 Jimmy Greaves (1940–2021), English footballer
 John Greaves, English mathematician and antiquary
 John Greaves (musician), British bass guitarist and composer
 John Edward Greaves (1846-1923), British vice-consul at Berdiansk, Russian Empire, founder of John E. Greaves and Co.
 John Ernest Greaves, Welsh slate mine owner and Lord Lieutenant of Caernarvonshire
 Johnny Greaves (boxer), English boxer
 Johnny Greaves (racing driver), American racetrack driver
 Johnny Greaves (rugby league), Australian rugby player
 Louise Archambault Greaves, filmmaker, co-producer, director with husband William Greaves
 Lucien Greaves (born c.1976), American social activist, a founder of the Satanic Temple
 Mark Greaves (born 1975), English football defender, played for Hull, Boston United etc.
 Melvyn Greaves (born 1941), British cancer biologist
 Nicholas Greaves (1605?–1673), English churchman, Dean of Dromore Cathedral, Co. Down
 Percy L. Greaves, Jr. (1906–1984), American economist and presidential candidate
 Philip Greaves (born 1931), Barbadian politician
 R.B. Greaves, R&B musician
 Sandra Greaves, Canadian judoka
 Shanae Greaves, (born 1993), Australian basketball player
 Thomas Greaves (footballer) (1888–1960), English football forward with Stoke 1908–11
 Thomas Greaves (musician) (fl. 1604)
 Thomas Greaves (orientalist) (1613–1676)
 Tommy Greaves (1892–19??), English football full back with Bury and Darlington 1911–28
 Tony Greaves, Baron Greaves (1942–2021), British Liberal Democrat politician
 Walter Greaves (artist) (1846–1930), artist and protégé of Whistler
 Walter Greaves (cyclist) (1907–1987), British cyclist who set the world record for distance ridden in a year
 William Greaves, filmmaker
 William Michael Herbert Greaves, British astronomer

See also
 Grieve (surname)
 Grieves (surname)
 Graver (surname)
 Graves (surname)
 Greeves (surname)
 Grieves (surname)
 Grover (surname)
 Groover (surname)
 Groves (surname)
 Reeves (surname)
 Reeve (surname)

References 

English-language surnames